The Ranks of the Imperial Japanese Army were the rank insignia of the Imperial Japanese Army, used from its creation in 1868, until its dissolution in 1945 following the Surrender of Japan in World War II.

Thus, for example, a captain in the navy shared the same rank designation as that of a colonel in the army:  (colonel), so the rank of  denoted an army colonel, while the rank of  denoted a naval captain.

Meiji 19 insignia

Officer ranks
The rank insignia of commissioned officers.

Other ranks
The rank insignia of non-commissioned officers and enlisted personnel.

Cap badges

Commissioned officer ranks 
The rank insignia of commissioned officers.

Other ranks
The rank insignia of non-commissioned officers and enlisted personnel.

See also 
 Ranks of the Imperial Japanese Navy
 Imperial Japanese Army
 Ranks and insignia of the Japan Self-Defense Forces

Notes

References
Citations

Bibliography
 
 

Imperial Japanese Army
Military ranks of Japan
Military insignia

ja:日本軍と自衛隊の階級#陸軍